Dana Nicole Amma Williams (born June 24, 1978), is known professionally as YahZarah, is a Ghanaian American singer and music producer. She is known for radio hits "Wishing" and "Why Dontcha Call Me No More". In 1997, she began her career as a background singer for Erykah Badu.

In 2000, Yahzarah signed to Keo Music Records released her first album, Hear Me. In 2002, Yahzarah signed a recording contract with Three Keys Music and released her second album, Blackstar, in September 2003. In 2004, YahZarah left Three Keys Music and join The Foreign Exchange. After a brief hiatus, Yahzarah returned the music industry. In 2008, she released her extended play, The Prelude, on the +FE Music recording label. In January 2010, Yahzarah released her single "Why Dontcha Call Me No More" followed by her third album, The Ballad of Purple St. James in May 2010.

Her musical genre has varied throughout her career including R&B, rock, acoustic, soul, jazz, and pop. Her artistic influences include Michael Jackson, Minnie Riperton, Prince, and The Beatles. She has a soprano vocal range with the ability to use the whistle register.

Early life
Dana Williams was born to Ghanaian activist and owner of the "Sporting News" Thomas Kojo OduroKwarten and Beverly Brown and then adopted by her step father Clarence Williams and raised partly in Germany and Washington D.C.. Williams started singing at the age of seven in her church choir. Her love for music began after winning a local youth talent search at the Kennedy Center at the age of ten. After years of honing her talent in churches, talent shows, and local concerts, she entered high school at Washington D.C.'s Duke Ellington School of the Arts. After graduating in 1998, she attended North Carolina Central University in Durham, North Carolina, where she received a full scholarship in the school's jazz program.

Musical career

1999–2004: Hear Me and Blackstar
In 1999, Williams recorded a few songs and toured with her band "Dirty Soul". She adopted the named "Yahzarah", as a tribute to her grandmothers Yaa Asantewaa and Sarah. In 2000, Yahzarah received her break into the recording industry by singing back-up vocals for Erykah Badu. Yahzarah also appeared in Badu's Bag Lady music video. Later in 2000, Yahzarah toured with Erykah Badu as the opening act for Badu's "Mama's Gun Tour".

In 2000, Yahzarah signed to Keo Music Records and began recording her first album. In early 2001, Yahzarah released her first single "Feel Me". In 2001, Yahzarah released her first album, Hear Me. The album also spawned the singles "Love Is You" and "Natural".

In 2002, YahZarah signed a recording contract with Three Keys Music and began recording sessions for her second album. In August 2003, Yahzarah released "Wishing" as the lead single for her second album. In September 2003, Yahzarah released her second album, Blackstar, and began her "Blackstar Tour". Later that year, Yahzarah returned to her hometown Washington D.C. to perform at the Black Luv Festival. In November 2003, she released the title-track "Blackstar" as the second single. In 2004, she released "One Day" as the third single. Later that year, Yahzarah left Three Keys Music and signed to The Foreign Exchange Music.

2005–2011: The Prelude and Purple St. James
In 2005, YahZarah was featured on Foreign Exchange's Connected album. The song "Sincere" which featured long-time friend Phonte was chosen as the single for the album. In 2008, Yahzarah released an extended play, entitled "The Prelude". She toured with Chaka Khan, Musiq Soulchild, The Roots, and R. Kelly to promote her EP. Yahzarah later appeared the Little Brother album The Minstrel Show. Later that year, YahZarah was the featured artist opener on the Anthony Hamilton "Playing it Cool Tour" which was featured at the House of Blues. She is also featured the album Leave It All Behind by The Foreign Exchange.

In 2009, YahZarah was elected to the "Board of Governors" for the Washington D.C. Chapter of the National Academy of Recording Arts and Sciences (NARAS) and still currently holds that post. Later that year, Yahzarah performed at the invitation of the Republic of Italy for the inauguration of Barack Obama. In the same year, YahZarah began recording sessions for her third album previously title, Introducing Purple St. James, later re-titled The Ballad of Purple St. James. In mid-2009, Yahzarah announced the album title "Introducing Purple St. James" along with the expected release date in the fall of 2009, which was later pushed back to May 2010. She continued to promote her upcoming album by touring. In July 2009, she toured with Conya Doss, Sy Smith, and Maya Azucena where she hosted the Soulsista Tour where she also tributed to Michael Jackson. In late 2009, Yahzarah reunited with long-time friend "Natalie "The Floacist" Stewart" to perform "Butterflies" in tribute to Michael Jackson.

In January 2010, Yahzarah released her buzz single "The Tickler". In March 2010, Yahzarah released the lead single "Why Dontcha Call Me No More". In May 2010, she released her third album, The Ballad of Purple St. James. A music video for her single "Why Dontcha Call Me No More" was released May 19, 2010. In mid-2010, Yahzarah began the "Love vs Lust Tour" along with The Foreign Exchange. In September 2010, Yahzarah released the second single "Cry Over You" along a music video. On September 18, 2010, Yahzarah announced that she will be touring with The Roots and Q-Tip on the 2010 Hennesy Artistry Tour. Yahzarah also made a cameo on the tune "I Remember" by Wes Felton on his album Land of Sheep, Ran by Pigs, Ruled by Wolves.

In July 2011, Yahzarah released the video for her single "Love Come Save the Day". In December 2011, Yahazarh re-appeared on FoxDC News to perform the single. On December 18, 2011, she released a Christmas single, "What Do The Lonely Do At Christmas".

2012–present: Recent activities
In 2012, Yahzarah began her Tribute to the Beatles Tour. In 2015, she toured as a backup for Lenny Kravitz during his Strut Europe Tour. In January 2017, she released a single "Running". In 2019, she toured as a backup vocalist for Madonna during her Madame X Tour.

Style

Vocal ability
Williams is a lyric soprano and who has been noted for her ability to sing in the whistle register. She possesses a four-octave vocal range. She has also been credited for her ability to sustain notes in the sixth and seventh octave.

Influences
Williams has been influenced by singers such as Prince, Stevie Wonder, and Erykah Badu. Although Yahzarah has done many R&B influenced songs, her primary musical style is heavily influenced by elements of electronic soul and rock.

Personal life
On July 28, 2011, Williams gave birth to her first son, Miles. He weighed 6 lbs and 5 ounces.

Discography

Albums
 Hear Me (2001)
 Blackstar (2003)
 The Ballad of Purple St. James (2010)
 The Ceremony (2021)

Tours
 Yahzarah & Dirty Soul Tour (1999)
 Mama's Gun Tour (opening act for Erykah Badu) (2000)
 Blackstar Tour (2003)
 Playing It Cool Tour (opening act for Anthony Hamilton) (2008)
 Soul Sista Tour (2009)
 Love-vs-Lust Tour (2010)
 The Foreign Exchange Tour (2010)
 The Hennesy Artistry Tour (2010)
 Tribute to Prince Tour (2011)
 Tribute to the Beatles Tour (2012–13)
 Strut Europe Tour (with Lenny Kravitz) (2015)
 Madame X Tour (with Madonna) (2019)

Awards and nominations

|-
| 2009
| Yahzarah
| Soultracks Readers' Choice Award: Female Vocalist of the Year
| 
|-
| 2010
| The Ballad of Purple St. James
| Soultracks Readers' Choice Award: Song of the Year
| 
|-
| 2010
| Yahzarah
| Soultracks Readers' Choice Award: Female Vocalist of the Year
| 
|}

References

External links
 
 Yahzarah's Official Myspace Page

American people of Ghanaian descent
North Carolina Central University alumni
American soul singers
1978 births
Living people
African-American women singer-songwriters
American sopranos
American contemporary R&B singers
21st-century American women singers
21st-century American singers
21st-century African-American women singers
20th-century African-American people
20th-century African-American women
Singer-songwriters from Washington, D.C.